Benjamin Day or Ben Day may refer to:

Publishing
Benjamin Day (publisher) (1810–1889), American illustrator and printer; founder of the original New York Sun
Benjamin Henry Day Jr. (1838–1916), American illustrator and printer
The Ben Day process, printing technology invented by Benjamin Henry Day Jr.

Other
Benjamin Day (cyclist) (born 1978), Australian professional road racing cyclist
Benjamin M. Day, 11th director of Ellis Island, from 1926 to 1931

See also
Day (surname)